#DigitalLivesMatter is a 2016 Comedy film, directed by Terri J. Vaughn. The film stars DC Young Fly as a social media superstar who finds out that his online accounts have been hacked.

Cast
DC Young Fly ... Himself
Carlos Aviles ... Mouse
Franco Castan ... Duncan Davis
Will Durrett ... Rex
Tyler Does ... Dale
Algy Fonts ... Roman
Rashan Ali ... News Reporter
Cornelius Boyd SR. ... Simon

External links

References

2010s English-language films